Eversel is a village in Heusden that is part of the municipality of Heusden-Zolder, Belgium. It is located in the northwestern corner of the municipality.

Eversel is also a Roman Catholic parish established in 1839. The local Roman Catholic church is dedicated to Saint James the Greater (Sint-Jacobus de Meerdere) and was inaugurated on 5 September 1849.
The nearby parish house is named Sint-Baaf after Saint Bavo.

Historically Eversel is a part of Houweiken that was part of the fiefdom of Vogelzang.  Although a part of Heusden, the dialect of Eversel tends to be closer to that of Beringen. It is a part of the Western Limburgish dialects, although linguists are not clear if the dialects in this region and especially the ones around Beringen are rather Brabantian than Limburgish.

Notes

External links
village council (in Dutch)

Heusden-Zolder
Populated places in Limburg (Belgium)